Nikolay Tsed (born 10 October 10, 1959, Ozery, Babruysk District) is a Russian political figure, deputy of the 8th State Duma.
 
Tsed worked as a researcher at the Military Institute of Physical Culture. Later, he started working at the Lesgaft National State University of Physical Education, Sport and Health. From 1994 to 1997, Tsed was the coach of the Saint Petersburg hand-to-hand combat team. From 2010 to 2012, Tsed was the Deputy Governor of the Kostroma Oblast Igor Albin. On April 23, 2013, Tsed was appointed the Head of the Administration of the Primorsky District. Since September 2021, he has served as deputy of the 8th State Duma.

References
 

 

1959 births
Living people
United Russia politicians
21st-century Russian politicians
Eighth convocation members of the State Duma (Russian Federation)